Thakiyudeen Abdul Wahid was an Indian entrepreneur and aviator. He was the Founder and Managing Director of the now-defunct East-West Airlines, the first scheduled private airline in the country. He was murdered on 13 November 1995.

Early life 
Wahid was born in Odayam village near Trivandrum in Kerala. He had a modest educational background and studied till 9th grade.

Career 
He began his business career with a travel agency with his brothers in Dadar, Mumbai to recruit manpower to Gulf countries. He started East-West Airlines in 1992 when the Indian Government reformed the airline industry by its "open skies policy". East-West Airlines commenced commercial operations on 28 February 1992.

The airline shut down its operations in 1996 after his death in 1995.

Death 
Wahid was shot dead on 13 November 1995 near his office in Mumbai.

References 

Indian businesspeople
People murdered in Mumbai
Indian aviation businesspeople
20th-century Indian businesspeople
People from Kerala
1995 deaths